Gus-Khrustalny is a town in Vladimir Oblast, Russia, located on the Gus River (a tributary of the Oka River)  south of Vladimir, the administrative center of the oblast. Population:     65,000 (1970); 40,000 (1939); 17,900 (1926).

Etymology
The name of the town may be translated as "crystal goose", for it is known as one of the oldest centers of glass industry in Russia and stands on the Gus River. There are reasons to believe that its name is not derived from goose directly, but rather from the common Slavic term "goose" (in the respective languages) for a large (up to several gallons) bottle.

History

Gus-Khrustalny was founded in 1756 with the construction of a crystal plant, Gus Crystal. It was granted town status in 1931.

Gus-Khrustalny is one of the towns of the Golden Ring.

Administrative and municipal status
Within the framework of administrative divisions, Gus-Khrustalny serves as the administrative center of Gus-Khrustalny District, even though it is not a part of it. As an administrative division, it is, together with the urban-type settlement of Gusevsky and one rural locality (the settlement of Panfilovo), incorporated as the Town of Gus-Khrustalny—an administrative unit with the status equal to that of the districts. As a municipal division, the Town of Gus-Khrustalny is incorporated as Gus-Khrustalny Urban Okrug.

Notable people
 Rem Soloukhin, a Soviet scientist specializing in physics and mechanics.

References

Notes

Sources

External links

Official website of Gus-Khrustalny 
Gus-Khrustalny Business Directory 

Cities and towns in Vladimir Oblast
Melenkovsky Uyezd
Golden Ring of Russia